Birger "Farsan" Sandberg (18 February 1918 – 28 June 1998) was a Swedish former football player and manager. He was Djurgårdens IF manager in 1959 together with Knut Hallberg.

References

Swedish footballers
Swedish football managers
Allsvenskan players
Djurgårdens IF Fotboll players
Djurgårdens IF Fotboll managers
1918 births
1998 deaths
Place of birth missing
Association footballers not categorized by position